Sarah Ward may refer to:
Sarah Ward (novelist), English novelist and critic
Sarah Ward (politician) (1895–1969), Conservative UK politician
Sarah Ward (theatre manager) (1726–1771), Scottish stage actor and theatre manager